Tori M. Nonaka (born 23 March 1995 in Woodbridge, Virginia, United States) is an American sport shooter with two IPSC Handgun World Shoot silver medals in the Standard division Lady category (2011 and 2014). She was one of three members of Team GLOCK. She grew up in Woodbridge, Virginia, where she began shooting at age 3. At age 12, Tori attended the US Shooting Academy, which sparked her interest in becoming a professional shooter and led her to begin shooting competitively. On March 2, 2011, GLOCK, Inc announced that 15-year-old Tori would be a member of Team GLOCK Shooting Squad. In March 2017 Tori went independent and left Team Glock. She was replaced by Ashley Rheuark.

Tori is an NRA member and has competed in various disciplines, including USPSA, SSCA, IPSC, IDPA, Bianchi & GSSF. In 2010, Tori earned the titles of USPSA National Juniors Champion in Limited 10 competition, the US Steel National Super Junior, and IDPA National Junior Champion. Already in 2011, Tori has taken home the titles of USPSA Area 6 Top Production Lady and High Junior, Pro AM High Junior and High A Class in the Limited Division.

In October 2011, Tori was a member of the gold medal winning USA Ladies Standard Team at the 2011 IPSC Handgun World Shoot in Rhodes, Greece, Tori was also the silver medalist in the ladies individual competition.

In 2013 Tori won the ladies Standard division at both the IPSC Australasia Handgun Championship in Rotorua, NZ, the IPSC European Handgun Championship in Barcelos, Portugal. Tori then became the youngest person ever (age 18) to win a USPSA Handgun Nationals title when she became the 2013 USPSA Limited 10 Ladies champion.

In 2017, Tori was no longer a member of Team Glock as another accomplished female shooter, Ashley Rheuark, was added to the team.

Ladies Titles

2010
 USPSA National Single Stack Juniors Champion
 IDPA National Juniors Champion
 USPSA National Limited-10 Juniors Champion
 USPSA National Limited-10 High C Class
 USPSA National Production High B Class IDPA East Coast Ladies Champion
 IDPA North Carolina State Ladies Champion
 IDPA North Carolina State Juniors Champion
 USPSA Virginia/Maryland Ladies Production Champion
 IDPA Virginia State Ladies Champion
 IDPA Virginia State High Expert
 US Steel National Super Junior Champion

2011
 IDPA Indoor Nationals Junior Champion
 USPSA Area 6 Production Division High Lady
 USPSA Virginia/Maryland Production Division High Lady
 US Steel National Rimfire Optic Ladies Champion

2013
USPSA Limited 10 Nationals
IPSC European Standard division
IPSC Australasian Standard division
Florida Open 
USPSA Area 6
USPSA Ohio State
USPSA Area 3
USPSA Area 2

References

1995 births
Living people
American female sport shooters
American people of Japanese descent
American people of Mexican descent
IPSC shooters
21st-century American women